Cletus Francis O'Donnell (August 22, 1917 – August 31, 1992) was an American prelate of the Roman Catholic Church who served as the second bishop of the Diocese of Madison in Wisconsin from 1967 to 1992.  He previously served as an auxiliary bishop of the Archdiocese of Chicago in Illinois from 1960 to 1967.

Biography

Early life 
Cletus O'Donnell was born on August 22, 1917, in Waukon, Iowa to Patrick and Isabel (Duffy) O’Donnell.  His father was a banker and his mother was a teacher. The family moved to Chicago in 1927.  In 1935, O’Donnell graduated from Archbishop Quigley Preparatory Seminary in Chicago in 1935.  A retreat at St. Mary of the Lake Seminary in Mundelein, Illinois, was a motivator for O'Donnell to join the priesthood.  In 1941, he received a master's degree from St. Mary.

Priesthood 
O'Donnell was ordained to the priesthood by Cardinal Samuel Stritch on May 3, 1941, for the Archdiocese of Chicago.  After his ordination, he was appointed as assistant pastor at Our Lady of Lourdes Parish in Chicago, serving there for a year. In 1942, O'Donnell entered the Catholic University of America in Washington, D.C., earning a Doctor of Canon Law degree in 1945.

Back in Chicago, O'Donnell was appointed as vice chancellor for the archdiocese.  He also became promoter of justice and defender of the bond.

Auxiliary Bishop of Chicago 
On October 26, 1960, Pope John XXIII appointed O'Donnell as an auxiliary bishop of the Archdiocese of Chicago.  He was consecrated by Cardinal Albert Meyer on December 21, 1960.  O'Donnell was also appointed as vicar general and consultor at that time.

After Meyer's death on April 9, 1965, O'Donnell served as archdiocesan administrator until the installation of Archbishop John P. Cody on August 24, 1965. O’Donnell was named pastor of Holy Name Cathedral Parish in February 1966.  O'Donnell would later describe his time at Holy Name as being one of the happiest points in his career.  In November 1966, he named to the administrative board of the National Conference of Catholic Bishops (NCCB). He also served as assistant treasurer and chair of the  American Board of Catholic Missions for the NCCB.

Bishop of Madison 
On February 18, 1967, Pope Paul VI appointed O'Donnell as bishop of the Diocese of Madison.  As bishop, he founded the diocesan Apostolate to the Handicapped on October 31, 1967.  He released this statement then:We will try to the best of our ability to do whatever we can for this often neglected segment of the People of God in the hope that they in turn will offer their prayers, sacrifices, and good works for the welfare of our diocese.O'Donnell also established ministries for the deaf and the developmentally disabled.  He also encouraged adult education and created a religious education consultants program to help individual parishes.

O’Donnell suffered a stroke on September 13, 1990 and then a second one in the spring of 1992.  His deteriorating health forced him to send a letter of resignation as bishop of Madison to the Pope.

Retirement 
On April 28, 1992, Pope John Paul II accepted O'Donnell resignation. Cletus O'Donnell died of a heart attack on August 31, 1992 in Madison.

In February 1995, several men sued the Diocese of Madison for failing to protect them as minors from acts of sexual abuse by Michael Trainor, a priest in the diocese, during the 1970's and 1980's.  The plaintiffs claimed that O'Donnell was aware of Trainor's abuse of children and transferred him from one parish to another without reporting him to the police or to the parishioners.

See also

 Catholic Church hierarchy
 Catholic Church in the United States
 Historical list of the Catholic bishops of the United States
 List of Catholic bishops of the United States
 Lists of patriarchs, archbishops, and bishops

References

External links
 Roman Catholic Diocese of Madison

1917 births
1992 deaths
People from Waukon, Iowa
Clergy from Chicago
Roman Catholic bishops of Madison
20th-century Roman Catholic bishops in the United States
Participants in the Second Vatican Council
Roman Catholic Archdiocese of Chicago
Religious leaders from Iowa
Religious leaders from Illinois
Catholics from Illinois
Catholics from Iowa